Ligustrum quihoui, or waxyleaf privet, is a shrub native to Korea and China (Anhui, Guizhou, Henan, Hubei, Jiangsu, Jiangxi, Shaanxi, Shandong, Sichuan, Xizang (Tibet), Yunnan, Zhejiang). As with some other members of the genus, L. quihoui is cultivated as an ornamental in many places and has become naturalized and invasive in urban areas and scattered forested locales of the southeastern United States (Texas, Oklahoma, Alabama, Mississippi, Florida, North Carolina, Virginia, Maryland).

Ligustrum quihoui is a shrubby, semi-evergreen to evergreen privet, one to three meters high. It is noted for its large sparse flowering panicles of scented white flowers, borne late in the growing season, for which it is sometimes grown in gardens.

Etymology
Ligustrum means 'binder'. It was named by Pliny and Virgil.

Quihoui was named for M. Quihou, once superintendent of the Jardin d'Acclimatation in Paris.

References

External links

line drawing, Flora of China Illustrations vol. 15, fig. 257, 4-5 
Texas Invasives Database
Le Jardin du Pic Vert (Domart su la Luce, Picardy, France), Troène de Chine, ligustrum quihoui
Quackin' Grass Nursery (Brooklyn, Connecticut USA), Ligustrum quihoui
Hopleys Plants Ltd. (Much Hadham, Hertfordshire, United Kingdom), Ligustrum quihoui
Alibaba Xiamen Tarinto Imp. & Exp. Co., Ltd. (Hong Kong), Ligustrum quihoui carr arbusto

quihoui
Flora of China
Flora of Anhui
Flora of Guizhou
Flora of Hubei
Plants described in 1869
Flora of Jiangsu
Flora of Jiangxi
Flora of Shaanxi
Flora of Korea
Flora of Shandong
Flora of Sichuan
Flora of Tibet
Flora of Yunnan
Flora of Zhejiang
Taxa named by Élie-Abel Carrière